This is an incomplete list of presidents of the Royal Philatelic Society London.

1800s
Sir Daniel Cooper 1869-78
Frederick Philbrick 1878-92
Henry King-Tenison, 8th Earl of Kingston 1892-96
King George V 1896-1910

1900s
James Lindsay, 26th Earl of Crawford 1910-13
M. P. Castle 1913-17
Edward Denny Bacon 1917-23
Thomas William Hall 1923-29
Walter Dorning Beckton 1929-31
Robert Blake Yardley 1931-34
Sir John Wilson, 2nd Baronet 1934-40
John Hall Barron 1940-46
Eric W. Mann 1946-49
Sir John Wilson, 2nd Baronet 1949-50
Herbert Weston Edmunds 1950-53
Kenneth Macdonald Beaumont 1953-56
William Gerrish 1956-61
H. R. Holmes 1961-64
Benjamin Rogers-Tillstone 1964-67
William A. Townsend 1967-70
Alfred J. Hubbard 1970-73
Sidney Hands 1973-75
Ronald A. Lee 1975-77
A. Ronald Butler 1978-80
George South 1981-83

John Marriott 1983-86
John Henry Levett 1986-88
Patrick Pearson 1988-90 

Charles Wyndham Goodwyn 1992-94
Francis Kiddle 1994-96 
Jane Moubray 1996-98 
Alan K. Huggins
Barrie Samuel Jay 1998-2000

2000s
Gavin Fryer 2000-03 
David Beech 2003-05 
Christopher Harman 2005-07?
John Sacher 2007-09?
Alan Moorcroft 2009-11?
Brian Trotter 2011-13 
Chris King 2013-15
Frank Walton 2015-17
Patrick Maselis 2017-19
Richard Stock 2019-2021
Peter Cockburn 2021-

References

Royal Philatelic Society London